Dennis Pineda may refer to:

 Denis Pineda (born 1996), Salvadoran footballer
 Dennis Pineda (politician), Filipino politician